Warren Andrew Ward (born November 16, 1989) is a Canadian professional basketball player who last played for Cáceres Patrimonio de la Humanidad of the Spanish LEB Oro. He played college basketball for the University of Ottawa.

Collegiate career 
Ward played at the college level at the University of Ottawa and ended his career there as its second all-time leader in points scored. He averaged 17.8 points, 7.6 rebounds, and 3.8 assists during his final season with the Gee Gees.

Professional career 
On January 9, 2015, Ward signed a contract with the Mississauga Power of the National Basketball League of Canada (NBL) in a return to his home country. One day later, he made his debut by recording 17 points and 9 rebounds against the Moncton Miracles. He grabbed a season-high 12 rebounds vs the Brampton A's on January 15 and notched a season-best 28 points against the Halifax Rainmen while recording 11 boards.

On September 8, 2015, Ward returned to the NBL Canada and signed with the London Lightning, a team that was coached by Kyle Julius, the same head coach he played under while with the Power. Julius said, "Warren brings a mental toughness and professionalism that will help our younger guys and allow us to play at a high level on a consistent basis. I am proud to have Warren as a member of our family, not only because he is a great basketball player, but also because he is someone I have a lot of respect for as a person." Following the season, Ward was named Canadian of the Year.

Ward played for Windsor Express during the 2016–17 season, before moving to Spain for playing with Cáceres Patrimonio de la Humanidad, of the Spanish second division.

International career 
Ward has experience representing Canada internationally, having played for his country in the 2011 Pan American Games and 2011 Summer Universiade. At the Universiade, his team placed second and, in turn, won the silver medal. Before going pro, Ward was sometimes known as the best amateur basketball player in Canada.

References 

1989 births
Living people
Basketball players at the 2011 Pan American Games
Basketball people from Ontario
Black Canadian basketball players
Cáceres Ciudad del Baloncesto players
Canadian expatriate basketball people in Germany
Canadian expatriate basketball people in Spain
Canadian men's basketball players
London Lightning players
Mississauga Power players
Pan American Games competitors for Canada
Sportspeople from Brampton
Sportspeople from London, Ontario
Shooting guards
Universiade medalists in basketball
University of Ottawa alumni
Windsor Express players
Universiade silver medalists for Canada
Medalists at the 2011 Summer Universiade